The 2004 South American Race Walking Championships were held in Los Ángeles, Chile, on April 3–4, 2004.  The track of the championship runs in the Avenida Ricardo Vicuña.  For the first time, the men's long race was 50 km rather than 35 km.

Complete results were published.   The junior events are documented on the World Junior Athletics History webpages.

Medallists

Results

Men's 20km

Team 20km Men

Men's 50km

Team 50km Men

Men's 10km Junior (U20)

Team 10km Men Junior (U20)

Men's 10km Youth (U18)

Team 10km Men Youth (U18)

Women's 20km

Team 20km Women

Women's 10km Junior (U20)

Team 10km Women Junior (U20)

Women's 5km Youth (U18)

Team 5km Women Youth (U18)

Participation
The participation of 83 athletes from 8 countries is reported.

 (10)
 (6)
 (10)
 (26)
 (11)
 (16)
 Perú (2)
 (2)

See also
 2004 Race Walking Year Ranking

References

South American Race Walking Championships
South American Race Walking Championships
South American Race Walking Championships
International athletics competitions hosted by Chile
April 2004 sports events in South America